I Win is a live album by Marvin Sapp recorded at 	Evangel Cathedral in Upper Marlboro, Maryland. The album debuted at number nine on the Billboard 200 with first-week sales of 37,000 copies.  The album has sold 161,000 copies in the United States as of May 2015.

Track listing

Chart positions

References

Marvin Sapp albums
2012 live albums